Richard M. Capobianco is an American philosophy professor and one of the leading commentators on the thought of the 20th century German philosopher Martin Heidegger. His two books, Engaging Heidegger and Heidegger's Way of Being, have led the way to a renewed appreciation of Heidegger's core concern with Being as temporal radiant emergence or manifestation. He has also brought Heidegger into closer proximity with American authors such as Walt Whitman, Henry David Thoreau, Ralph Waldo Emerson, John Muir, and E. E. Cummings, and with English poets such as William Wordsworth and Gerard Manley Hopkins.

Background
Capobianco received a B.A. in economics and philosophy from Hofstra University in 1979. He was inducted into Phi Beta Kappa in 1978. He is currently a professor of philosophy at Stonehill College in North Easton, Massachusetts. He earned his M.A. and Ph.D. in philosophy at Boston College, where his principal teacher and mentor was the preeminent Heidegger commentator William J. Richardson, who also wrote the foreword to his book Engaging Heidegger. Capobianco teaches courses on Existentialism, Hermeneutics, American Philosophy, and Aesthetics, and he has received several awards for teaching excellence, including a national recognition from the Princeton Review.

Selected works
Engaging Heidegger, University of Toronto Press, 2010.
Heidegger's Way of Being, University of Toronto Press, 2014.

External links
Publications & Research
Ereignis Interview
Interview with Figure/Ground
Philosophy Department, Stonehill College.

References

20th-century American philosophers
21st-century American philosophers
American philosophy
Analytic philosophers
Living people
Existentialists
Hermeneutists
Stonehill College
Year of birth missing (living people)